Shona Joy Thatcher is an Australian fashion designer and owner of the label "Shona Joy".

Early life 
Born in Melbourne, Thatcher grew up loving to watch her mother get ready for an event or a party and having input into what she wore. As a child Thatcher began collecting classic pieces at vintage stores and hunting for treasures at markets. Her mother died when Thatcher was in her mid-twenties. Thatcher studied a BA of textile design then worked as a Design Assistant at Australian brands "Charlie Brown" and later at "Marcs".

Career 
In 2000, Thatcher began selling her hand painted designs at Spitalfields and Portobello markets in London and then the iconic Bondi Beach and Paddington Markets. Thatcher then designed a capsule collection of hand painted t-shirts for Belinda Seper's Corner Shop in Paddington and Christy Turlington bought them in every color. After the success of her t-shirts, the first Shona Joy collection was sold into David Jones. At the time there was a team of two in the brand and had a mix of silks and cotton voiles and customised prints in easy, voluminous silhouettes. Thatcher realised she could have a successful career in fashion after the first collection had a 94% sell thru in the first week at David Jones.

Still based in Sydney, Australia the Shona Joy label is led by Thatcher and grounded by a love of designing for real women. The label has grown and now creates 5 ready-to-wear collections every year that are stocked internationally at leading stores from David Jones, Harrods, Revolve and Intermix to Harvey Nichols and Bloomingdales. The Shona Joy brand quickly became a market leader in the bridesmaid space, with a focus on evening wear dresses.

In 2021, Shona Joy presented at Afterpay Australian Fashion Week via a virtual experience led by panoramic images on the beaches of Green Island in Manyana, New South Wales near where Thatcher resides.

Personal life 
Thatcher is married with two sons.

References 

Living people
Australian fashion designers
Australian women fashion designers
Year of birth missing (living people)